Along Came Jones is a 1945 American Western comedy film directed by Stuart Heisler and starring Gary Cooper, Loretta Young, William Demarest, and Dan Duryea. The film was adapted by Nunnally Johnson from the 1944 novel Useless Cowboy by Alan Le May. It was the only feature film produced by Cooper during his long film career.

Much of the film was shot at the Iverson Movie Ranch in Chatsworth, California. Cooper had previously worked at the movie ranch in The Lives of a Bengal Lancer (1935) and other productions. Cooper had a Western town built at the movie ranch for Along Came Jones; this Western set was subsequently used in many other productions over the next 20 years and became a fixture in B-Westerns in particular.

Premise
Easygoing Melody Jones (Gary Cooper) and his friend George Fury (William Demarest) wander into a town. Jones is mistaken for a wanted bandit named Monte Jarrad (Dan Duryea), which causes him no end of trouble. Meanwhile, the real Jarrad is hiding out in the home of his girl, Cherry de Longpre (Loretta Young). At first, she tries to use the newcomer to distract the townsfolk, but as she gets to know Jones, her feelings start to change.

The film spoofs many Western film cliches as well as the Western persona that Cooper played in previous films, such as the lead character being unable to shoot straight and partial to singing "silly songs" while riding his horse.

Cast
 Gary Cooper as Melody Jones
 Loretta Young as Cherry de Longpre
 William Demarest as George Fury
 Dan Duryea as Monte Jarrad
 Frank Sully as Avery de Longpre
 Don Costello as Leo Gledhill
 Walter Sande as Ira Waggoner
 Russell Simpson as Pop de Longpre
 Arthur Loft as Sheriff
 Willard Robertson as Luke Packard
 Ray Teal as Kriendler
 Lane Chandler as Boone
 Erville Alderson as Bartender (uncredited)
 Hank Bell as Posse Rider (uncredited)

Production
Along Came Jones was produced under the working title American Cowboy. It was Cooper's first Western since The Westerner in 1940. It was also Cooper's first film as an independent producer under his International Pictures, Inc., with Cinema Artists Corp. co-producing, and the only film in which he both acted and produced. Cooper also selected Young as his co-star.

Much of the film was shot at the Iverson Movie Ranch in Chatsworth, California, where Cooper built the town of Payneville for the script. This Western set was used in many other productions over the next 20 years. Other outdoor filming locations included Sasabe, Tucson, and Nogales, Arizona. A number of exterior scenes were filmed in indoor sound stages backed by giant cycloramas. Scenes of the actors riding horses and exchanging dialogue were filmed with rear-projection screens.

Critical reception
Martin and Porter's DVD guide describes Along Came Jones as a "[h]ighly watchable comic western," giving it a rating of 4 out of 5 ("Very Good"). Variety called the film "a better-than-average western" and commended Cooper's and Young's performances. Bosley Crowther writes in his review for The New York Times: "Mr. Cooper is the guy who can play it. His Melody is a most congenial gent—butter-fingered and mentally clumsy, but disarmingly winning withal". A Trailers from Hell review wrote that the film "is concocted to please the Cooper fans, a mix of comedy, sentiment, romance and a little fancy gunplay". This review calls the film's first act "almost as funny as a Preston Sturges movie", and the first two acts "nearly flawless".

Radio adaptation
Along Came Jones was presented on This Is Hollywood December 28, 1946. Janet Blair and Joel McCrea starred in the adaptation.

In popular culture

The film's ironic title probably inspired the popular 1959 Coasters song "Along Came Jones" written by Leiber and Stoller; songwriter Mike Stoller had studied orchestration under Arthur Lange, the composer of the film's score.

In the film Cooper sings the song "I'm a Poor Lonesome Cowboy", which would later become the signature song of Lucky Luke in the eponymous comics series by René Goscinny and Morris.

References

External links

Along Came Jones at Dan Duryea Central
 
 
 
 
 
 Iverson Movie Ranch: History, vintage photos.

1945 films
Films based on American novels
Films based on Western (genre) novels
American Western (genre) comedy films
Films directed by Stuart Heisler
American black-and-white films
1940s Western (genre) comedy films
Films with screenplays by Nunnally Johnson
Films adapted into radio programs
Films scored by Arthur Lange
1945 comedy films
RKO Pictures films
1940s English-language films
1940s American films